Chlorine perchlorate is a chemical compound with the formula Cl2O4.  This chlorine oxide is an asymmetric oxide, with one chlorine atom in +1 oxidation state and the other +7, with proper formula ClOClO3. It is produced by the photodimerization of chlorine dioxide (ClO2) at room temperature by 436 nm ultraviolet light:

2 ClO2  →  ClOClO3

Chlorine perchlorate can also be made by the following reaction at −45 °C.

CsClO4 + ClOSO2F → Cs(SO3)F + ClOClO3

Properties
Chlorine perchlorate is a pale greenish liquid. It is less stable than ClO2 (chlorine dioxide)  and decomposes at room temperature to give O2 (oxygen), Cl2 (chlorine) and Cl2O6 (dichlorine hexoxide): 

2 ClOClO3 → O2 + Cl2 + Cl2O6

Chlorine perchlorate reacts with metal chlorides to form chlorine and the corresponding anhydrous perchlorate:

CrO2Cl2 + 2 ClOClO3 → 2 Cl2 + CrO2(ClO4)2

TiCl4 + 4 ClOClO3 → 4 Cl2 + Ti(ClO4)4

2 AgCl + 2 ClOClO3 → 2 AgClO4 + Cl2

Reactions

Notes

References

Chlorine oxides
Acidic oxides
Chlorine(VII) compounds
Perchlorates